Joe 'Apikotoa (born 18 July 1996) is a rugby union player, who currently plays as a prop for  in New Zealand's domestic National Provincial Championship competition and for  in Super Rugby. He was born and raised in New Zealand, but has represented Tonga internationally, for which he is eligible due to his Tongan descent.

Early career

'Apikotoa was born in Wellington and attended St Patrick's College, Silverstream, where he played both rugby and league.

Rugby

He played for his school's 1st XV team in the Wellington Premiership 1st XV competition in 2012, 2013 and 2014.

After his return from a brief league stint in Australia (see below), 'Apikotoa played for Hutt Old Boys-Marist in the Wellington Premier club rugby competition.

He was part of the Wellington U19 team that finished fifth at the Jock Hobbs Memorial National U19 tournament in 2015.

League

In 2012 and 2013, 'Apikotoa played for the Wellington Orcas U17 team. He was named the Wellington Orcas 17s Player of the Year and Junior Player of the Year in 2013. A year later, he played for the premier Wellington Orcas squad.

While still at school, he signed a 2-year contract with Melbourne Storm (starting in November 2014), but in December 2014 he already returned home to New Zealand and from then on focused on playing rugby.

Senior career

While he was not named in the Wellington Lions squad for the 2015 ITM Cup season, 'Apikotoa played 5 games off the bench for them that year. He made his Wellington debut on 15 August 2015 against . 'Apikotoa was named in the Wellington Lions squad in 2016 and 2017 and played 22 games for the province.

In 2017, 'Apikotoa was selected in the  squad for the inaugural Brisbane Global Rugby Tens.

In search for more game time, he moved to Hawke's Bay the following year and was named in the Magpies squad for the 2018 Mitre 10 Cup season. He played 11 games for the province, that year.

Later that year, 'Apikotoa had a brief stint in Spain, where he played 9 games for the Basque club Ordizia RE that competes in the Spanish División de Honor de Rugby. He returned home before the end of their season, to look for playing opportunities in New Zealand.

He went back to Hawke's Bay and was named in the Magpies squad for the 2020 Mitre 10 Cup season. During that season, the Magpies won the Ranfurly Shield (taking it off ), were successful in three more Ranfurly Shield defences (against ,  and ), and won the Mitre 10 Cup Championship, thus securing a well-deserved promotion to the Premiership division. The Magpies held on to the Shield during the entire 2021 Bunnings NPC season, winning all six Ranfurly Shield defences.

After a successful 2020 season with the Magpies, while not named in the initial ' squad for the 2021 Super Rugby season, 'Apikotoa was signed by the franchise as an injury replacement.

On 9 November 2021, Moana Pasifika announced that the new franchise had signed 'Apikotoa for the 2022 Super Rugby Pacific season.

International career

Rugby

'Apikotoa was invited to attend a New Zealand U20 Development Camp in November 2015 and an U20 trial camp in March 2016, but wasn't named in the New Zealand Under-20 squad for the 2016 Oceania Rugby Under 20 Championship and the 2016 World Rugby Under 20 Championship.

On 27 May 2022, 'Apikotoa – who is of Tongan descent – was named in the Tongan national team for the 2022 Pacific Nations Cup and the Asia/Pacific qualification match for the 2023 Rugby World Cup.  He made his international test debut for Tonga on 2 July 2022 against Fiji.

League

In 2013, 'Apikotoa played for the New Zealand Residents U18 team that played two tests against Australian Secondary Schools XIII. A year later, he was selected again and played two tests against the New South Wales-based Taurahere Kiwis.

Reference list

External links
NZ Rugby History profile
División de Honor Player Profile
itsrugby.co.uk profile

1996 births
Living people
New Zealand sportspeople of Tongan descent
People educated at St. Patrick's College, Silverstream
Rugby union players from Wellington City
New Zealand rugby union players
Rugby union props
Wellington rugby union players
Hawke's Bay rugby union players
Chiefs (rugby union) players
Moana Pasifika players
Tonga international rugby union players
Tongan rugby union players